Gilke Croket (born 1 November 1992) is a Belgian racing cyclist. She rode at the 2014 UCI Road World Championships.

Major results
2012
2nd Team Pursuit, UEC European U23 Track Championships (with  Jolien D'Hoore and Sarah Inghelbrecht)

References

External links

1992 births
Living people
Belgian female cyclists
Place of birth missing (living people)
Cyclists at the 2019 European Games
European Games competitors for Belgium
People from Bornem
Cyclists from Antwerp Province
21st-century Belgian women